The 2001–02 season is Zamalek Sports Club 91st season of football since existence in 1911, 47th consecutive season in the Egyptian Premier League, the top flight in the Egyptian football. The club qualified to the 1st edition of the Egyptian Super Cup, also qualified to the 2002 CAF Champions League, as well as represent the CAF at the 2001 FIFA Club World Championship as the first Egyptian team.

Competitions

2001–02 Egyptian Premier League

Position

2001 Egyptian Super Cup

2001–02 Egypt Cup

Quarter-finals

Semi-finals

Final

2002 CAF Champions League

First round

Second round

Group stage

Semi-finals

Final

2001 FIFA Club World Championship

As winners of the 2000 African Cup Winners' Cup, Zamalek SC was one of the 12 teams that were invited to the 2001 FIFA Club World Championship, which would be hosted in Spain from 28 July to 12 August 2001. However, the tournament was cancelled, primarily due to the collapse of ISL, which was marketing partner of FIFA at the time.

Group stage

References

Zamalek SC seasons
Zamalek